Elena Medved (née Semenchenko; born 23 January 1985) is a former Russian footballer. She played as a defender for Ryazan and the Russia national team.

Club career
She played for FC Zorky Krasnogorsk since 2011.

International career
She took part in the 2004 FIFA U-19 Women's World Championship. She was called up to be part of the national team for the UEFA Women's Euro 2013.

Personal life
Medved was born in Moscow. She played in the national team under the surname Semenchenko before her marriage.

Honours
FC Zorky Krasnogorsk
Winner
 Supreme Division: 2012–13

Runner-up

 Supreme Division: 2011–12
 Russian Women's Cup: 2012

References

External links
 
 
 
 Profile at soccerdonna.de 
 Profile at fussballtransfers.com 

1985 births
Living people
Russian women's footballers
Russia women's international footballers
FC Zorky Krasnogorsk (women) players
Footballers from Moscow
Women's association football defenders
Ryazan-VDV players
CSP Izmailovo players
Russian Women's Football Championship players